Fractured may refer to:

 Fracture, the separation of a material into pieces under the action of stress
 Bone fracture, a partial or complete break in the continuity of the bone

Books
 Fractured, a 2008 novel by Karin Slaughter
 Fractured, a 2021 non-fiction book by Jon Yates

Film and TV
 Fractured (2013 film), an American horror film by Adam Gierasch
 Fractured (2019 film), an American thriller film by Brad Anderson
 “Fractured”, an episode of The Good Doctor

Music
 Fractured (Capharnaum album) or the title song, 2004
 Fractured (Lunatic Soul album) or the title song, 2017
 Fractured, an album by New Mind (Jonathan Sharp), 1993
 "Fractured" (Bill Haley song), 1953
 "Fractured (Everything I Said Was True)", a song by Taproot, 2010

See also 
 Fracture (disambiguation)
 Fraction (disambiguation)
 Fragment (disambiguation)
 Shatter (disambiguation)